Evan William Watkins (third ¼ 1882 – 9 January 1956) was a Welsh rugby union, and professional rugby league footballer who played in the 1900s, and cricketer who played in the 1900s and 1910s. He also played cricket for Monmouthshire.

Playing career
Evan Watkins made his début for Warrington on Saturday 8 February 1908, and he played his last match for Warrington on Friday 17 April 1908. He played cricket for Abertillery Town Cricket Club, Blaina Cricket Club, and Monmouthshire in the Minor Counties Championship between 1909 and 1911, making 6 appearances.

Genealogical information
Evan Watkins' younger brother was the Olympic gymnast Edgar Watkins. Evan's marriage to Miriam (née Davies) was registered during first ¼  1914 in Llandovery district.

References

External links
Search for "Watkin" at rugbyleagueproject.org

1882 births
1956 deaths
Abertillery RFC players
Footballers who switched code
Monmouthshire County RFC players
Monmouthshire cricketers
Rugby league players from Merthyr Tydfil
Rugby league wingers
Rugby union players from Merthyr Tydfil
Warrington Wolves players
Welsh cricketers
Welsh rugby league players
Welsh rugby union players